Gebbia is a surname. Notable people with the surname include:

Joe Gebbia (born 1981), American designer and Internet entrepreneur
Megan Gebbia (born 1973), American basketball coach and player